The I. C. Thomas Drug Store is a historic three-story building in Sheboygan, Wisconsin. It was designed by architect Arvin L. Weeks, and built as a drugstore for Max R. Zaegel in 1886. From 1920 to 1971, it belonged to I. C. Thomas, another pharmacist. The building has been listed on the National Register of Historic Places since July 10, 1974.

References

1886 establishments in Wisconsin
Commercial buildings completed in 1886
Defunct pharmacies of the United States
National Register of Historic Places in Sheboygan County, Wisconsin
Pharmacies on the National Register of Historic Places